Martin Mpuga (born 20 November 1992) is a Ugandan footballer, who played as a defender for Maroons FC.

International career
In January 2014, coach Milutin Sedrojevic, invited him to be included in the Uganda national football team for the 2014 African Nations Championship. The team placed third in the group stage of the competition after beating Burkina Faso, drawing with Zimbabwe and losing to Morocco.

References

Living people
1992 births
Ugandan footballers
Maroons FC players
SC Victoria University players
Kampala Capital City Authority FC players
Police FC (Uganda) players
Association football defenders
Uganda international footballers
2014 African Nations Championship players
Sportspeople from Kampala
Uganda A' international footballers